Railway Koduru is a town in Annamayya district of the Indian state of Andhra Pradesh, located in the Rayalaseema Region  .

Railway Koduru Mandal is one of the India's largest mining areas and a major exporter of Barytes primarily via Chennai's ports. Other exports from the area are mangoes and bananas, and the area is also famous for mosambi/battayi and various citron plants.

Sights and attractions around Koduru include the Seshachalam hills and Gundalakona, a regionally famous Lord Shiva temple.

Lok Sabha constituency
Railway Koduru Lok Sabha constituency is a part of Rajampet Lok Sabha constituency along with other six Vidhan Sabha segments, namely, Rajampet, Rayachoti, in Kadapa district and Thamballapalle Pileru, Madanapalle, Punganur in Chittoor district.

Assembly constituency
Railway Koduru is an assembly constituency in Andhra Pradesh. Currently it is reserved for SC's.

Transport 
Koduru is well connected by roadways and railways. The nearest airport is Tirupati's Renigunta Airport, at approximately 40 km away.

Notable People 

 P. Jaya Kumar, Filmmaker, Screenwriter, Author in Indian cinema
 Vanamali, Telugu Lyricist

References 

Cities and towns in Kadapa district